Marián Dávidík (born 18 November 1977 in Dolný Kubín) is a Slovak orienteering competitor. He received a silver medal in the classic distance at the 2000 European Orienteering Championships in Truskavets.

References

External links
 
 

1977 births
Living people
Slovak orienteers
Male orienteers
Foot orienteers
Competitors at the 2001 World Games
Competitors at the 2005 World Games
Junior World Orienteering Championships medalists